Richard Gary Bowness (born January 25, 1955) is a Canadian professional ice hockey coach and former player who is the head coach of the Winnipeg Jets of the National Hockey League (NHL). Bowness played right wing for the Atlanta Flames, Detroit Red Wings, St. Louis Blues, and original Winnipeg Jets and Central Hockey League, American Hockey League, and Quebec Major Junior Hockey League teams. Bowness has been a head coach for the original Winnipeg Jets, Boston Bruins, Ottawa Senators, New York Islanders, Phoenix Coyotes, Dallas Stars, and the second iteration of the Winnipeg Jets. He has also been an associate coach with the Vancouver Canucks and Tampa Bay Lightning.

As of 2022, he is the last active coach in the NHL who was also a head coach for an NHL team in the 1980s, and the first and only coach to have led both iterations of the Winnipeg Jets.

Playing career

Junior hockey
Born in Moncton, New Brunswick, Bowness began his junior hockey career with the Quebec Remparts of Quebec Major Junior Hockey League (QMJHL) in 1972–73, where in 30 games, Bowness had two goals and nine points. In 14 playoff games with Quebec, Bowness had a goal and five points.

Bowness started the 1973–74 season with the Remparts. He appeared in 34 games, scoring 16 goals and 45 points. Midway through the season, the Remparts traded Bowness to the Montreal Bleu Blanc Rouge, with whom he finished the season, scoring nine goals and 26 points in 33 games with the club, helping them to reach the playoffs. In nine postseason games, Bowness had four goals and eight points.

In 1974–75, Bowness played the entire season with the Bleu Blanc Rouge, appearing in 71 games, scoring 24 goals and 95 points to finish fourth in team scoring. In eight playoff games, Bowness scored five goals and eight points. After the season, Bowness was drafted by the Atlanta Flames in the second round, 26th overall in 1975 NHL Amateur Draft, as well as in fifth round, 62nd overall by the Indianapolis Racers of the World Hockey Association (WHA) in the 1975 WHA Amateur Draft.

Professional playing career
Bowness spent the majority of first professional hockey season in 1975–76 with the Tulsa Oilers of the Central Hockey League (CHL), where in 64 games, he earned 25 goals and 63 points, and had 160 penalty minutes. In nine playoff games, Bowness had four goals and seven points. Bowness also played two games with Nova Scotia Voyageurs of American Hockey League (AHL), recording one assist. Bowness also made his National Hockey League(NHL) debut during the 1975–76 season, going pointless in five games with the Atlanta Flames.

His 1976–77 season was split between Tulsa and the Flames, as Bowness appeared in 39 games with Tulsa, scoring 15 goals and 30 points. In eight postseason games with Oilers, Bowness had one assist. He also played in 28 games with Atlanta Flames, recording four assists. On August 18, 1977, the Flames traded Bowness to the Detroit Red Wings for cash considerations.

Bowness spent the entire 1977–78 NHL season in the NHL with Detroit, scoring eight goals and 19 points in 61 games, helping the team reach the playoffs. In four playoff games with Detroit, Bowness was held off the scoresheet as the Red Wings lost to the Montreal Canadiens in the quarter-finals. He was set to return to the Red Wings for the 1978–79 season, however, on October 10, 1978, Detroit traded Bowness to the St. Louis Blues for cash.

Bowness spent most of the 1978–79 season in the CHL with the Salt Lake Golden Eagles, appearing in 48 games with the team, scoring 25 goals and 53 points with Salt Lake. In ten playoff games with the Golden Eagles, Bowness had five goals and nine points. Bowness also appeared in 24 games with the St. Louis Blues, scoring a goal and four points with the club. Bowness once again spent a majority of the 1979–80 with the Golden Eagles. In 71 games with Salt Lake, Bowness had 25 goals and 71 points to finish fifth in team scoring, while accumulating a team high 135 penalty minutes. In 13 playoff games with Salt Lake, Bowness had five goals and 14 points. He also played in 10 games with the Blues, scoring a goal and three points. On June 13, 1980, the Blues traded Bowness to the Winnipeg Jets for Craig Norwich.

Bowness played in 45 games with the Winnipeg Jets in the 1980–81, scoring eight goals and 25 points, however, the Jets failed to make the playoffs. Bowness also returned to the Tulsa Oilers of the CHL for 35 games, scoring 12 goals and 32 points. He spent the entire 1981–82 regular season playing with Tulsa, finishing second on the team in scoring with 34 goals and 87 points in 79 games. In three playoff games with the Oilers, Bowness had two assists. Bowness also appeared in a playoff game with the Jets, and was held off the scoresheet.

In the 1982–83 season, Bowness was a player-coach with the Sherbrooke Jets of the American Hockey League (AHL). In 65 games, Bowness had 17 goals and 48 points with Sherbrooke. Bowness wrapped up his playing career in the 1983–84 season with Sherbrooke, playing in 21 games, scoring nine goals and 20 points. He retired after the season to become an assistant coach with the Winnipeg Jets.

Career statistics

Regular season and playoffs

Coaching career

Winnipeg Jets (original franchise)
Bowness became the first head coach of the Winnipeg Jets' new AHL affiliate, the Sherbrooke Jets, in the 1982–83 AHL season, as a player-coach with the club. Sherbrooke had a tough season, finishing in last place in the North Division with a 22–54–4 record, earning 48 points. He stepped down as player-coach before the 1983–84, as he played one last season before retiring in the summer of 1984.

Bowness became an assistant coach of the Winnipeg Jets under head coach Barry Long in the 1984–85 season. Winnipeg had a successful season, going 43–27–10, earning 96 points, finishing second in the Smythe Division. In the playoffs, the Jets defeated the Calgary Flames before losing to the Edmonton Oilers in the Smythe Division final.

Bowness remained on the Jets coaching staff in the 1985–86 season, however, the club changed head coaches during the season, as Barry Long was replaced with John Ferguson late in the season. The Jets struggled to a 26–47–7 record, earning 59 points, but still good for third in the Smythe Division. In the season opener against the Calgary Flames, Bowness was once fined $500 and suspended for three games after punching Calgary forward Tim Hunter in the head during a brawl. Brian Hayward and Hunter had been involved in a scuffle which escalated to a full brawl, after Hunter continued to attack Hayward. In the playoffs, the Jets were swept by the Flames in the first round.

In 1986–87, Winnipeg hired a new head coach, Dan Maloney, and retained Bowness as an assistant. The Jets rebounded from their poor season, going 40–32–8, earning 88 points, to finish in third place in the Smythe Division. In the playoffs, Winnipeg defeated the Flames in the opening round, however, they were swept by the Oilers in the Smythe Division final. After the season, Bowness became the first head coach of the Moncton Hawks for the 1987–88 season. Bowness led the expansion team to a 27–43–8–2 record, earning 64 points and a sixth place finish in the North Division, failing to qualify for the playoffs.

He began the 1988–89 season with Moncton, leading the club to a 28–20–5 record in 53 games. Bowness was then promoted to the NHL, as the Winnipeg Jets fired Dan Maloney, and named Bowness as head coach.

Bowness coached his first NHL game on February 9, 1989, as the Jets lost to the New York Rangers 4–3 at Madison Square Garden. After a 0–3–1 start, Bowness earned his first NHL victory on February 17, 1989, defeating the New Jersey Devils 3–2 in overtime at the Winnipeg Arena. Bowness led the team to an 8–17–3 record to finish the 1988–89 season, as the Jets missed the playoffs. After the season, the Jets hired Bob Murdoch as their new head coach, and Bowness left the organization.

Boston Bruins organization
Bowness became the head coach of the Boston Bruins' AHL affiliate, the Maine Mariners, for the 1989–90 AHL season. In his first season with Maine, Bowness led the club to a 31–38–11 record, earning 73 points and a fifth place finish as the club failed to qualify for the playoffs. He returned to the Mariners for a second season in 1990–91, as the Mariners improved to a 34–34–12 record, getting 80 points, however, Maine finished in fifth place yet again, and failed to make the playoffs.

Bowness returned to the NHL to become the head coach of the Bruins for the 1991–92 season. He coached his first game as a Bruin on October 3, 1991, defeating the New York Rangers 5–3 at the Boston Garden. Overall, the Bruins finished the season with a 36–32–12 record, earning 84 points and second place in the Adams Division. Bowness coached his first playoff game on April 19, 1992, losing 3–2 to the Buffalo Sabres. The Bruins eventually won the series in seven games, followed by a four-game sweep over the Montreal Canadiens to reach the Wales Conference finals. It was the Bruins' first four-game playoff sweep over the Canadiens. Boston was then swept by the Pittsburgh Penguins, who went on to win the Stanley Cup.

After just one season with the Bruins, Bowness was not brought back, as Boston replaced him with Brian Sutter. Bowness then took a job with the expansion Ottawa Senators, becoming that franchise's first head coach.

Ottawa Senators
Bowness became the first head coach of the expansion Ottawa Senators when he was hired in 1992. On October 8, 1992, the Senators won the franchise's first game, over the eventual Stanley Cup champion Montreal Canadiens 5–3 at the Ottawa Civic Centre. With a lineup perilously thin on talent, wins for Bowness and the Senators were few and far between, and Ottawa finished with a league-worst 10–70–4 record, earning 24 points and a tie for last place in the overall NHL standings with the San Jose Sharks.

Bowness returned to the Senators for the 1993–94 season. Though Ottawa boasted a somewhat stronger lineup and improved its season total by 13 points, the team nonetheless finished in last place in the NHL with 37 points.

Under Bowness' leadership, the Senators continued to go through some growing pains but also steadily improved. In the team's lockout-shortened third season, Ottawa finished with a 9–34–5 record in the shortened 48 game schedule, finishing in last place in the league for the third straight season.

Bowness began a fourth season with the Senators in 1995–96. After a promising start which saw Ottawa record a 6–5–0 record after 11 games, the club fell into an eight-game losing streak and fell to 6–13–0, and Bowness was relieved of his duties. He was replaced by Dave Allison, who would ultimately win only two of 27 games and be fired mere weeks later.

New York Islanders
Bowness joined the New York Islanders as an associate coach for the 1996–97 under head coach Mike Milbury. After the Islanders got off to a rough 13–23–9 start, Milbury resigned and Bowness became the new head coach of the Islanders. On January 22, 1997, Bowness coached his first game with New York, leading the team to a huge 8–1 victory over the Edmonton Oilers. The Islanders went 16–18–3 under Bowness; however, they failed to reach the playoffs. Bowness returned as the Islanders' head coach for the 1997–98 season; however, the club struggled to a 22–32–9 record, and he was fired, as Mike Milbury replaced him behind the bench.

Phoenix Coyotes
Bowness joined the Phoenix Coyotes (the former Winnipeg Jets) coaching staff as an assistant under Bobby Francis for the 1999–2000 season. The Coyotes had a strong season, going 39–31–8–4, earning 90 points and third place in the Pacific Division, sixth in the Western Conference. In the playoffs, the Coyotes lost in five games to the Colorado Avalanche in the first round. Despite finishing with a 35–27–17–3 record, earning 90 points, the Coyotes failed to reach the playoffs in the 2000–01, as Phoenix finished in ninth place in the Western Conference.

The Coyotes rebounded in the 2001–02, going 40–27–9–6 to earn 95 points and finish in sixth place in the Western Conference and reach the postseason. In the playoffs, the Coyotes lost in five games to the San Jose Sharks in the first round. After the season, the Coyotes' head coach Francis won the Jack Adams Award for Coach of the Year.

Phoenix struggled in the 2002–03 season, going 31–35–11–5, earning 78 points and 11th place in the Western Conference, well out of a playoff position. The club had another tough season in 2003–04, as the Coyotes had a 20–24–15–3 before the team fired Francis and named Bowness as interim head coach. Under Bowness, Phoenix continued to struggle, as they went 2–12–3–3, and finished well out of the postseason once again.

With the 2004–05 NHL lockout cancelling the season, Bowness returned to the club in 2005–06 as an assistant under new head coach Wayne Gretzky. The Coyotes missed the playoffs once again with a 38–39–5 record, earning 81 points. After the season, Bowness left the club.

Vancouver Canucks
Bowness joined the Vancouver Canucks as an assistant coach under Alain Vigneault for the 2006–07 season. In his first season with Vancouver, the team won the Northwest Division with a 49–26–7 record, earning 105 points and third in the Western Conference. In the playoffs, the Canucks defeated the Dallas Stars in seven games in the first round, however, Vancouver lost in five games to the Anaheim Ducks in the second round.

The Canucks struggled to a 39–33–10 record in 2007–08, earning 88 points, and an 11th place finish in the Western Conference, out of the playoffs. Vancouver rebounded in 2008–09, winning the Northwest Division for the second time in three seasons, going 45–27–10, recording 100 points and third place in the Western Conference. In the playoffs, the Canucks swept the St. Louis Blues in four games, however, they lost to the Chicago Blackhawks in six games in the second round.

The 2009–10 was another very successful season for the Canucks, as the club once again won the Northwest Division with a 49–28–5 record, good for 103 points and third in the Western Conference. Vancouver defeated the Los Angeles Kings in six games, however, they lost to the Blackhawks in six games in the second round for the second consecutive season.

The club had a record breaking 2010–11, as the Canucks won the Presidents' Trophy with a 54–19–9 record, earning a club record 117 points. In the postseason, Vancouver defeated their rivals, the Blackhawks in seven games, followed by winning a six-game series against the Nashville Predators to make the Western Conference final. The Canucks easily defeated the San Jose Sharks to clinch a berth in the 2011 Stanley Cup Finals against the Boston Bruins. In the final round, the Canucks built a 3–2 series lead, however, the club lost their last two games to lose the Stanley Cup in seven games. In 2013, after being swept in the first round of the playoffs, Bowness, head coach Vigneault, and assistant coach Newell Brown were all fired from their positions in the Canucks coaching staff on May 22, 2013.

Tampa Bay Lightning
Bowness joined the Tampa Bay Lightning as associate coach on June 3, 2013, joining first-year head coach Jon Cooper. His responsibilities included the team's defense and penalty-killing. On February 7, 2015, Bowness coached in his 2000th game in the NHL. On June 14, 2016, Bowness signed a multi-year extension with the Lightning. He was dismissed on May 31, 2018, after general manager Steve Yzerman called the defense "not quite good enough" during the regular season and the playoffs.

Dallas Stars
Bowness was hired by the Dallas Stars as an assistant coach on June 22, 2018. On December 10, 2019, he was named interim head coach of the Stars after Jim Montgomery was fired due to unprofessional conduct. At the time of his promotion, Bowness had a career record of 123–289–51 as a head coach. He led the Stars to the Stanley Cup Finals where they lost to his former team, the Tampa Bay Lightning, in six games.

On October 29, 2020, he was named the Stars' 24th head coach in the franchise history. After a disappointing 2020–21 campaign, Bowness guided the Stars back to the postseason in 2022 where they lost a close seven-game series to the Calgary Flames. 

Shortly after Dallas' elimination from the 2022 Stanley Cup playoffs, and with his contract set to expire, Bowness stepped away from his position on May 20, 2022.

Winnipeg Jets 
On July 3, 2022, the modern Winnipeg Jets franchise named Bowness head coach, replacing Dave Lowry.

Head coaching record

References

External links
 

1955 births
Living people
Arizona Coyotes coaches
Atlanta Flames draft picks
Atlanta Flames players
Boston Bruins coaches
Canadian expatriate ice hockey players in the United States
Canadian ice hockey coaches
Canadian ice hockey left wingers
Dallas Stars coaches
Detroit Red Wings players
Ice hockey people from New Brunswick
Indianapolis Racers draft picks
Montreal Bleu Blanc Rouge players
New York Islanders coaches
Nova Scotia Voyageurs players
Ottawa Senators coaches
Quebec Remparts players
St. Louis Blues players
Salt Lake Golden Eagles (CHL) players
Sherbrooke Jets players
Sportspeople from Moncton
Tampa Bay Lightning coaches
Tulsa Oilers (1964–1984) players
Vancouver Canucks coaches
Winnipeg Jets coaches
Winnipeg Jets (1972–1996) coaches
Winnipeg Jets (1979–1996) players